Swissôtel The Stamford, formerly known as The Westin Stamford, is a hotel in Singapore managed by Accor. Designed by architect I.M. Pei, at a height of  it was the tallest hotel in the world when opened in 1986 and remains one of Southeast Asia's tallest hotels. It is part of the Raffles City complex comprising two hotels, the Raffles City Convention Centre, Raffles City shopping centre, and an office tower. Situated at 2 Stamford Road, the hotel sits above City Hall MRT station and Esplanade MRT station.

The 5-star hotel is a sister hotel of Fairmont Singapore and has 1,252 rooms and suites, 15 restaurants and bars, Raffles City Convention Centre, and one of Asia's largest spas, Willow Stream Spa. A major renovation of the hotel was completed in 2019.

History  

The hotel was designed by architect I.M. Pei as The Westin Stamford, along with its adjacent smaller sister hotel, The Westin Plaza.

On 1 January 2002, the two Westins were sold to Swissôtel/Raffles Hotels and both hotels were renamed, The Westin Stamford became Swissôtel The Stamford and The Westin Plaza became Raffles The Plaza. When Raffles Hotels was acquired by Fairmont in 2006, the smaller hotel was again renamed, becoming the Fairmont Singapore.

Swissôtel The Stamford has 15 food and beverage outlets including JAAN by Kirk Westaway (awarded one star in the Michelin Guide's Singapore edition for 3 consecutive years), recreational facilities, and a  convention center.

Restaurants at the Raffles City hotels
The food, beverage and spa outlets at both Swissôtel The Stamford and Fairmont Singapore are operated by the same management.

 Swissôtel The Stamford
 CLOVE (formerly Cafe Swiss)
 JAAN by Kirk Westaway
 Kopi Tiam
 SKAI 
 SKAI Bar
 The Stamford Brasserie
 Bar Rouge Singapore
 Fairmont Singapore
 The Eight
 Anti:dote
 Asian Market Cafe
 Mikuni
 Prego 
 Szechuan Court and Kitchen

Raffles City Convention Centre
Raffles City Convention Centre (RCCC) spans more than 108,000 square feet of flexible function space, including 27 meeting rooms and three ballrooms.

The centre also provides off-site catering. Some major long-term events include the Singapore Air Show (since 2004) and Singapore Grand Prix (since 2007)

Awards 
 Time Out Singapore 2010 Best of Awards: New Asia.
 World Gourmet Summit Awards of Excellence 2009 – Rising Chef of the Year: André Chiang of Jaan par André.
Singapore Tatler Best Restaurant Guide 2009 – Hall of Fame: Jaan par André.
Michelin Guide Singapore 2016 – one star: Jaan by Kirk Westaway.

See also

 List of tallest buildings in Singapore

References

External links

 Swissôtel The Stamford official website

Hotel buildings completed in 1986
Downtown Core (Singapore)
Skyscraper hotels in Singapore
Hotels established in 1986
1986 establishments in Singapore
I. M. Pei buildings
20th-century architecture in Singapore